The following is a list of notable people who were either born in, lived in, are current residents of, or are otherwise closely associated with the city of Boise, Idaho.

Notable people 

 Robert Adler, inventor
 William Agee, former business executive
 Joe Albertson, founder of the Albertsons chain of grocery stores
 Kathryn Albertson, wife of Joe Albertson and notable philanthropist; born in Boise
 Cecil Andrus, Idaho's only four-term governor; Secretary of the Interior
 James Jesus Angleton, former chief of the CIA counter-intelligence staff
 Torrie Wilson, former WWE professional wrestler.
 Steve Appleton, businessman and aviation enthusiast
 Kristin Armstrong, 3x Olympic cycling gold medalist
 Matthew Barney, artist
 Rick Bauer, Major League Baseball player
 Andy Benoit, journalist for Sports Illustrated
Andrew Blaser (born 1989), American skeleton racer 
 Phyllis Brooks, actress
 Bill Buckner, former Major League Baseball player
 Maggie Carey, director, writer
 John P. Cassidy, Los Angeles City Council member, 1962–67, born in Boise
 James Charles Castle, deaf artist
 Annetta R. Chipp, temperance leader and prison evangelist
 Frank Church, U.S. Senator, Chairman of the Senate Foreign Relations Committee
 Anthony Doerr, novelist
 Ben Driebergen, winner of Survivor: Heroes vs. Healers vs. Hustlers
 Stephen Fife, Major League Baseball pitcher
 John M. Haines, mayor and governor
 Mark Gregory Hambley, ambassador
 Gene Harris, jazz musician
 Michael Hoffman, film director
 Jack Hoxie, rodeo cowboy, Hollywood silent movie cowboy actor
 Ernie Hughes, NFL player
 Morgan James, singer, songwriter, and actress
 Eilen Jewell, singer-songwriter and band leader
 Joëlle Jones, Comic book artist and writer
 Scott Jorgensen, mixed martial artist
 Dirk Kempthorne, mayor, governor, senator, and secretary of the interior
 Mert Lawwill, American professional motorcycle racer, 1969 AMA Grand National Champion.
 Robin Long, United States Army soldier who deserted to Canada due to his opposition to the Iraq War
 David Lynch, film director, spent much of his childhood in Boise
 Doug Martsch, musician, of Boise indie-rock band Built To Spill
 Brett Nelson, musician and songwriter
 Maureen O'Hara, actress
 Reginald Owen, character actor
 Thom Pace, musician and songwriter
 William Petersen, actor
 Jeret Peterson, silver medalist, 2010 Winter Olympics, freestyle skiing
 Jake Plummer, football quarterback
 Bridget Powers, actress
 Bruce Reed, political advisor
 Paul Revere, musician
 Brian Scott, auto racer
 Johnny Sequoyah, child actress, best known for starring in Believe, born in Boise
 Jeremy Shada, voice actor (Adventure Time)
Sandra Shellworth, alpine skier 
 Brandi Sherwood, Miss Teen USA 1989 and Miss USA 1997
 Sydney Shoemaker, philosopher
 Frank Shrontz, businessman
 J. R. Simplot, businessman
 Robert Smylie, governor
 Sally Snodgrass, Idaho state senator
 Michael J. Squier, U.S. Army Brigadier General and deputy director of the Army National Guard
 Gary Stevens, Hall of Fame jockey and actor
 Curtis Stigers, musician and songwriter
 Kristine Sutherland, television actress
 Billy Uhl, five-time gold medal-winning motorcycle enduro competitor; founder of the Idaho State Parks Trail Ranger Program advocating for responsible off-road vehicle usage
 Benjamin Victor, world-renowned sculptor and Professor of Practice and Artist in Residence at Boise State University
 Wayne Walker, football linebacker and broadcaster
 Viola S. Wendt, poet
 Dick Wesson, television and movie trailer announcer

See also

References 

Boise
Boise